Penpuli is a 1977 Indian Malayalam-language film, directed by Crossbelt Mani. The film stars KPAC Lalitha, Adoor Bhasi, Unnimary and Rajakokila. The film's score is composed by G. Devarajan.

Cast
KPAC Lalitha 
Adoor Bhasi 
Unnimary 
Rajakokila 
Vijaya
Vincent

Soundtrack
The music was composed by G. Devarajan with lyrics by Mankombu Gopalakrishnan.

References

External links
 

1977 films
1970s Malayalam-language films